Hildur Sigurðardóttir (born 15 October 1981) is an Icelandic basketball coach and player. She is the former head coach of Úrvalsdeild kvenna club Breiðablik and an assistant coach to the Icelandic women's national basketball team. As a player she won the Icelandic championship five times and the Icelandic Basketball Cup three times. She was named the Úrvalsdeild Domestic Player of the Year four times and is the leagues all-time leader in assists She was the third player to reach 4000 points in the Úrvalsdeild kvenna. and remains second all-time in total rebounds in the league.

Playing career

Club career
After coming up through the junior ranks of Snæfell, Hildur started her senior career with ÍR in the Úrvalsdeild kvenna.

After the 2003-2004 season, Hildur was named the Domestic Player of the Year, the Defensive Player of the Year and to the Domestic All-First Team.

She played with Jämtland Basket during the 2004-2005 Damligan season.

After one season in Sweden, Hildur returned to the Úrvalsdeild and signed with Grindavík.

In 2011, Hildur rejoined her hometown team of Snæfell and helped propel them to the top of the league. She was named the Úrvalsdeild's best domestic player in both 2014 and 2015.

Hildur retired after the 2014-2015 season and a year later, in June 2016, she was hired as the head coach of Breiðablik. Due to rash of injuries on her Breiðablik squad, Hildur donned a uniform on 21 March 2018, against Njarðvík. In six minutes, she had two points and 4 assists in a 59-77 loss.

In 2022, Hildur returned to Snæfell, now in the second-tier 1. deild kvenna, in a limited role due to injuries on the squad. She appeared in two league games and one cup game.

National team career
Hildur is the most capped player in Icelandic women's national basketball team history, playing 79 games between 1999 and 2014.

Coaching career
Hildur was hired as the head coach of Breiðablik's women's team in June 2016. In her first season, she led the team to promotion to Úrvalsdeild kvenna.

In October 2017, Hildur was hired as an assistant coach to the Icelandic women's national basketball team.

On April, 2018, Hildur resigned as the head coach of Breiðablik.

Personal life
Hildur is married to Bjarni Már Magnússon, a professor of law at Reykjavík University and former basketball player.

Awards, titles and accomplishments

Individual awards
Úrvalsdeild Domestic Player of the Year (4): 2003, 2004, 2014, 2015
Úrvalsdeild Domestic All-First Team (13): 2001-2004, 2006-2010, 2012–2015
Úrvalsdeild Playoffs MVP: 2014
Úrvalsdeild Defensive Player of the Year : 2004
Úrvalsdeild Young Player of the Year : 1999

Titles
Icelandic champion (5): 2001, 2002, 2010, 2014, 2015
Icelandic Basketball Cup (3): 2001, 2002, 2009
Icelandic Supercup (4): 1999, 2009, 2010, 2014
Icelandic Company Cup (3): 2000, 2009, 2012

Accomplishments
Úrvalsdeild assists leader (4): 2008, 2010, 2014, 2015
Úrvalsdeild all-time career assists leader

References

External links
Icelandic statistics 2008-present

1981 births
Living people
Hildur Sigurdardottir
Hildur Sigurdardottir
Hildur Sigurdardottir
Hildur Sigurdardottir
Hildur Sigurdardottir
Hildur Sigurdardottir
Hildur Sigurdardottir
Hildur Sigurdardottir
Hildur Sigurdardottir
Hildur Sigurdardottir
Hildur Sigurdardottir
Hildur Sigurdardottir
Point guards